Dharmapuri division is a revenue division in the Dharmapuri district of Tamil Nadu, India.

References 
 

Dharmapuri district